is a Japanese electronic money system introduced by ÆON in April 2007. It is a rechargeable contactless smart card. Like many other smart card systems in Japan, it uses RFID technology developed by Sony known as FeliCa. The card's official mascot is a white dog. The card reader makes a "waon" sound upon successful transaction, a Japanese onomatopoeia for dog barks.

Unlike the nanaco card issued by Seven & I Holdings, the basic Waon card can be purchased without any registrations. Like other FeliCa-based systems, Waon has a mobile payment system, known as Mobile Waon.

Types of cards
Waon Card: A basic prepaid card that does not require registration.
Waon Card Plus: A card for ÆON Card holders. Accepts postpay as well.
ÆON Card (Waon Card integrated): A credit card.

Waon Card is issued by ÆON, while other two cards are issued by AEON Credit Service.

Usable stores
As of September 2007
130 stores in Kantō region, Yamanashi, and Niigata
AEON Shopping Center
AEON Supercenter
AEON Tower Pharmacy
Carrefour
Diamond City
JUSCO
Karadalab
Kids Kyōwakoku
Marinpia
MaxValu
Mega Mart
Ministop
My Basket
MYCAL (Saty and Vivre)
Within 2008
23,000 stores of AEON Group in all Japan

In Kantō region, AEON Group stores already accept Suica, iD, and PASMO as well. For other regions, they plan to accept other cards such as ICOCA or TOICA.

All JAL Mileage Bank cards issued in Japan built-in with Waon. However, JAL Mileage Bank cards issued overseas does not feature this function.

See also
List of smart cards
Electronic money
Edy
nanaco

External links
 Official website 

Japanese brands
Digital currencies
Contactless smart cards
Currencies introduced in 2007
2007 establishments in Japan